Harriet Beecher Stowe House may refer to:

 Harriet Beecher Stowe House (Hartford, Connecticut), listed on the National Register of Historic Places (NRHP)
 Harriet Beecher Stowe House (Brunswick, Maine), NRHP-listed
 Harriet Beecher Stowe House (Cincinnati, Ohio), NRHP-listed

See also
 Harriet Beecher Stowe
 Mandarin, Florida